Darlington Igwekali (born 4 April 2000) is a Nigerian professional footballer who plays as a defender for Emirates.

Career statistics

Club

References

External links
 
 

2000 births
Living people
Nigerian footballers
Nigerian expatriate footballers
Alanyaspor footballers
FC Olimpik Donetsk players
Ajman Club players
Fujairah FC players
UAE Pro League players
UAE First Division League players
Association football defenders
Expatriate footballers in Turkey
Expatriate footballers in Ukraine
Expatriate footballers in the United Arab Emirates
Nigerian expatriate sportspeople in Turkey
Nigerian expatriate sportspeople in Ukraine
Nigerian expatriate sportspeople in the United Arab Emirates
Place of birth missing (living people)